Scott A. Muller (born June 28, 1970 in Rochester, Minnesota) is a Panamanian-American who competed for Panama as a slalom canoer from 1995–2003. He finished 44th in the K-1 event at the 1996 Summer Olympics in Atlanta.  In 2002 he won a bronze medal at the Pan American Slalom Kayak Championships  on the Aconcagua river in Chile.

From 2007–2012, Muller was the Director  for the Clinton Foundation- Clinton Climate Initiative and the C40 Cities Climate Leadership Group in Lima, Peru.

References
Sports-Reference.com profile

1970 births
Canoeists at the 1996 Summer Olympics
Living people
Panamanian American
Panamanian male canoeists
Olympic canoeists of Panama